The discography of Stereopony, an all female Japanese rock band formed in Okinawa, Japan, consists of 3 studio albums, 1 compilation album, 12 singles, 4 video albums, and 13 music videos. After forming the band in 2007, Stereopony's three members Aimi (vocals/guitar), Nohana (bass), and Shiho (drums) performed on Tokyo FM's School of Lock! program, and were soon signed to Sony Music Japan's gr8! Records record label. The trio released their first single "Hitohira no Hanabira" in 2008, followed by their second single "Namida no Mukō" and third single "I Do It", both released in 2009. "Namida no Mukō" is the band's highest charting single on Japanese Oricon singles chart, peaking at No. 2. Stereopony's first three singles were later featured on the band's debut studio album Hydrangea ga Saiteiru (2009), which peaked at No. 7 on Oricon's albums chart.

Stereopony's fifth single "Tsukiakari no Michishirube" (2009) was their second single to reach the top 10 Oricon singles chart, peaking at No. 8. Stereopony's sixth single "Hanbunko" (2010) is a cover originally released by Bivattchee in 2002. Stereopony's fourth through seventh singles were released on the band's second album Over The Border (2010). Stereopony's ninth single "Tatoeba Utaenakunattara" (2011) is a collaboration with fellow Okinawan band Kariyushi58. The band's third and final album More! More!! More!!! (2011) features their eighth through tenth singles. The band released two more singles in 2012 before disbanding.

Albums

Studio albums

Compilation album

Singles

Video albums

Music videos

Other album appearances

References
General

Specific

External links
Stereopony's official website 

Discographies of Japanese artists
Rock music group discographies